Arlebosc is a commune in the Ardèche department in the Auvergne-Rhône-Alpes region of southern France.

The inhabitants of the commune are known as Arleboscois or Arleboscoises

Geography
Arlebosc is located some 12 km west by south-west of Tournon-sur-Rhône and 8 km north-east of Lamastre. Access to the commune is by the D578 road from Saint-Jeure-d'Ay in the north passing through the village and continuing west then south-west to join the D534 north-west of Lamastre. Apart from the village there are the hamlets of Saint-Just in the north-east and Les Fauries in the western extension of the commune. The commune is rugged and heavily forested with some farmland on the eastern side.

The Doux river forms part of the south-western border and flows through the commune from south-west to north-east. The Ruisseau de Balaye forms the western border as it flows south to join the Doux. Other streams rise in the commune and flow south-east to join the Doux. The Merdenc rises in the north of the commune and forms part of the northern border as it flows north-east to join the Daronne south-east of Saint-Félicien.

Neighbouring communes and villages

Toponymy
A legend attributes the name of the commune to one of its Lords: Bozon d'Arles.

In reality, it is a name from the Old French -bosc (a primitive form of bois meaning "wood") attested in the Occitan form of Arlabosc from 912 and Latinized to Allabosco in the 14th century.

Ernest Nègre explained the first element as an Occitan form erela meaning "cranberry". The French term for cranberry (Airelle) is considered to be a borrowing from a variant of the Massif Central or the Alpine éiréla (also airelo). The Provençal aire is also used for "cranberry", from the Latin ater meaning "black", d'où la signification globale de « bois des airelles ».3, so the overall meaning is "forest of cranberries".

Administration

List of Successive Mayors

Demography
In 2017 the commune had 331 inhabitants.

Distribution of Age Groups
The population of the town is older than the departmental average.

Percentage Distribution of Age Groups in Arlebosc and Ardèche Department in 2017

Source: INSEE

Sites and Monuments

The Chateau of Chazotte (17th century) is registered as an historical monument.
The Chateau of Malgaray
The Chateau of Romaneaux
The Church of Saint Sacrement from the 19th century. The church contains several items that are registered as historical objects:
2 Statues: Torch-bearing Angels (18th century)
A Silk Cope (19th century)
A Group Sculpture: Crucifixion
A Ciborium (1657)
The Chapel of Saint Just

Picture Gallery

Notable people linked to the commune
Myriam Gagnaire, a presenter on France 3 and TV5 Monde on "Side gardens" is a resident of the commune and artistic director of http://www.lacompagnieduchatquilouche.fr , a cultural association whose headquarters is in Arlebosc and covers the Ardèche department with various cultural and educational activities in association with the local authorities.

See also
Communes of the Ardèche department

References

External links
Arlebosc on the National Geographic Institute website 
Arlebosc on Géoportail, National Geographic Institute (IGN) website 
Arlebosc on the 1750 Cassini Map

Communes of Ardèche